Grębocin may refer to the following places:
Grębocin, Kuyavian-Pomeranian Voivodeship (north-central Poland)
Grębocin, Lesser Poland Voivodeship (south Poland)
Grębocin, West Pomeranian Voivodeship (north-west Poland)